Blue corn (also known as Hopi maize, Yoeme Blue, Tarahumara Maiz Azul, and Rio Grande Blue) is several closely related varieties of flint corn grown in Mexico, the Southwestern United States, and the Southeastern United States.  It is one of the main types of corn used for the traditional Southern and Central Mexican food known as tlacoyo.

It was originally developed by the Hopi, the Pueblo Indians of the Rio Grande in New Mexico, and several Southeastern Tribes, including the Cherokee. It remains an essential part of Hopi dishes like piki bread. Blue corn meal is a corn meal that is ground from whole blue corn and has a sweet flavor. It is also a staple of New Mexican cuisine used commonly to make tortillas.

Varieties
Five Hopi blue corn cultivars identified in the 1950s showed significant differences for several traits, such as plant height, kernel weight, width of kernel, and thickness of kernel. The different varieties have a color range from nearly black to blue-grey, with names derived from the "standard" blue ("sakwaqa'o"), hard blue ("huruskwapu"), and grey-blue ("maasiqa'o").

The traditional Hopi blue corn varieties are extremely drought-tolerant, deep-rooted, and somewhat short plants, seldom exceeding 4 to 5 feet in height. The Rio Grande pueblo blue corn varieties are taller, reaching 5–7 feet, higher yielding, and not as drought-tolerant as the Hopi varieties. Both varieties of blue corn prefer deep, sandy soils.

Other native varieties of blue corn include Yoeme Blue, a small kernel, short (3 to 4 feet), bushy, and very heat-tolerant low desert blue corn variety cultivated on the Salt River Pima Reservation in Arizona, and the Tarahumara northern Mexican variety Tarahumara Maiz Azul, cultivated in the high deserts bordering the Sierra Madre in Northern Mexico. Tarahumara Maiz Azul is widely used to make tortillas and tamales in Mexico, as well as tesgüino, a Tarahumaran corn beer.

A Cherokee heirloom variety of blue corn which originated from the Eastern Band of Cherokee Indians is called Cherokee White Eagle Corn and is distributed to Cherokee tribal members from the Cherokee Nation Seed Bank. It is a tall variety, reaching 5 to 7 feet, and is high yielding.

Tortilla protein content

In 100 grams of blue corn tortilla (Sakwavikaviki), the protein content is 7.8%, compared to 5.7% in yellow corn tortillas.

Anthocyanins

Varieties of blue corn cultivated in the Southwestern United States vary in their respective contents of anthocyanins, the polyphenol pigment giving the corn its unique color. Anthocyanins having the highest contents are cyanidin 3-glucoside (most abundant), pelargonidin and peonidin 3-glucoside.

Food uses

Aside from its use in traditional Southwestern dishes of tortillas and cereal, blue corn is used commercially in products such as blue corn chips and blue corn pancake mix.

Symbolic uses

The Hopi used corn in religious rituals, placing blue corn in a framework of directional associations in which yellow corn was associated with the Northwest; blue corn with the Southwest; red corn with the Southeast; white corn with the Northeast; black corn with the Above, and all-colored corn with the Below.

See also
 List of maize dishes
 Purple corn

References

Maize varieties
Crops originating from Pre-Columbian North America
Pre-Columbian Southwest cuisine
Hopi culture
Crops originating from indigenous Americans
Plants used in Native American cuisine
Crops originating from the United States